The 1938–39 Northern Football League season was the 46th in the history of the Northern Football League, a football competition in Northern England.

Clubs

The league featured 14 clubs which competed in the last season, no new clubs joined the league this season.

Billingham South dropped the ‘South’ part from their name.

League table

References

1938-39
4